Asian Kung-Fu Generation Presents: Nano–Mugen Compilation 2012 is a compilation album released by Asian Kung-Fu Generation on June 27, 2012 to advertise their tenth annual Nano-Mugen Festival, to be held at the Yokohama Arena on July 15 and 16. It features songs from Asian Kung-Fu Generation, Motion City Soundtrack, Straightener, and other bands that will perform for the 2012 Nano-Mugen Festival and have performed on Nano-Mugen Circuit from June 4 to June 8 of the same year.

Track listing

External links
 CDJapan
 Nano-Mugen Fes official website 

Asian Kung-Fu Generation albums
2012 compilation albums